Jean-Claude Colin, S.M. was a French priest (7 August 1790 – 15 November 1875) who became the founder of the Society of Mary (Marists).

Early life
When Jean-Claude Colin’s parents married in 1771 his father Jacques was 24 years old, and his mother Marie Gonnet was not yet 14. Jean-Claude, born on 7 August 1790 at the hamlet of Barbery, in the Beaujolais region of central France. 

He was their eighth child. All told, nine children were born into the family. Claudine, Jean, Mariette, Sébastien, Jeanne-Marie, Pierre, Anne-Marie (who died at birth), Jean-Claude and Joseph. Jean-Claude’s oldest sister Claudine was his godmother, and his brother Jean was his godfather, hence the baby’s name Jean-Claude. His parents owned and cultivated a piece of land, and during the winter turned to weaving.

The Revolution and the subsequent Civil Constitution of the Clergy brought a split into the Church, separating priests who supported the Constitution from those who remained faithful to Rome. Jean-Claude’s parents supported the clergy loyal to Rome. An order of arrest was issued against Jacques Colin who had openly supported the parish priest, Father Cabuchet. Jacques had to hide for a year: his house was boarded up and all his goods were sold.
In 1795 Marie Colin died, aged 37. Jacques Colin died not quite three weeks later, leaving the children orphaned. Jean Claude was not yet five years old. He was put under the care of a paternal uncle, Sébastien, who lived at Saint-Bonnet-le-Troncy. 

Sébastien was a bachelor who employed a housekeeper, Marie Echallier, to look after the children of the Colin household. This lady was a deeply religious woman, but one of those for whom religion and guilt seemed to go hand in hand. In these years Jean-Claude developed a scrupulosity which gave him much trouble, but which was in later life to make sensitive to burdened people.

At the age of fourteen Jean-Claude and his brother Pierre, entered the minor seminary of Saint-Jodard, a secondary school for boys preparing for priesthood, and hoping to spend a life of quiet prayer in a gentle ministry. The disciplined lifestyle, obedience and piety came easily to him. The River  Loire was nearby, close enough for the lads of St Jodard to enjoy its banks and summer waters. 

In 1809 Jean-Claude continued his secondary studies at Alix, and finally at Verrières-en-Forez, where he was a contemporary of Marcellin Champagnat and John Vianney. Despite being beset with serious illness and questions raised about his suitability for an active life, Jean-Claude handled his studies without difficulty and was among the top students.

At the end of the summer of 1813 Jean-Claude set off for the major seminary of Saint Irenaeus at Lyon for the final years of preparation for the priesthood. He was twenty-three years old. Here he met with Jean-Claude Courveille. 

Towards the end of 1814 Jean-Claude Courveille, who had been a student in another seminary, transferred to Saint Irenaeus. His diocese had been suppressed and merged into Lyon. Courveille had been cured of semi-blindness after prayer to Our Lady of Le Puy and in gratitude had the inspiration and inner conviction that just as there had arisen at the time of the Reformation a Society dedicated to Jesus, the Jesuits, so at this time of Revolution there could be a Society dedicated to Mary whose members would call themselves Marists. Courveille recruited a group of senior seminarians to his idea of founding a Society of Mary. 

On 22 July 1816, several deacons of St Irenaeus were ordained priests of the Lyon diocese. They included Colin, Courveille and a youthful Marcellin Champagnat. Next day, 23 July, a group of twelve climbed the hill to the shrine of Notre-Dame de Fourvière overlooking Lyons to the ancient chapel of the Blessed Virgin Mary. Here, they pledged to establish the Society of Mary as soon as they could. 

Colin celebrated his first Mass at Salles on 26 July. Newly ordained Frs Courveille and Champagnat were also  dispatched at once to parishes in the Lyon archdiocese.

Curate
The still shy Jean-Claude Colin was sent to the parish of his older brother, Fr Pierre Colin, in the village of Cerdon nestling high in the Bugey mountains in the newly restored diocese of Belley. While serving as assistant pastor at Cerdon, in the Diocese of Lyons, he drew up provisional rules for the Society of Mary. Pierre was eager to join the Marist Project and he convinced Jean-Marie Chavoin and Marie Jotillon to begin it with them. 

The town of Cerdon having passed to the newly reorganized Diocese of Belley, Colin obtained from its bishop, Mgr. Devie, permission to take a few companions and preach missions in the Bugey a poor and somewhat neglected part of the diocese. 

Their number increased, and in spite of the opposition of the bishop, who wished to make the society a diocesan congregation, Colin obtained (1834) from Gregory XVI the Papal bull approving the Lay Confraternity or Association of the Blessed Virgin Mary  for the Conversion of Sinners and the Perseverance of the Just. In 1836 Pope Gregory XVI gave canonical approbation of the Society of Mary (priests and brothers) as an order with simple vows.

Society of Mary

He was asked to take over the College of Belley as Principal and when Rome approved the Society of Mary in 1836 he was elected as its first Superior General. During the eighteen years of his administration (1836-1854) Colin showed great activity, organizing the different branches of his society, founding in France missionary houses and colleges. Rome assigned the new Society the evangelisation of the Vicariate of Western Oceania.

In 1817 the Colin brothers invited two young women to come to Cerdon to begin the Sisters of the Congregation of Mary. One was to become its foundress: Jeanne-Marie Chavoin. Meanwhile, Father Champagnat was establishing the Brothers' branch in his first parish of La Valla. Always he saw Jean-Claude Colin as the leader of the Marist project.

In 1850 the Papal approval for the laity was amended establishing the Lay branch of the Society as the Third Order of Mary. Laity were integral to Colin's vision for the Society of Mary from its earliest beginnings and he worked closely with laity at the parish in Cerdon.  Laity are now involved in all parts of the world and his lay legacy is still particularly strong in Oceania.

In 1854 Colin resigned the office of superior general and retired to Notre-Dame-de-la-Neylière, where he spent the last twenty years of his life revising and completing the Constitutions. The Constitutions of the Society of Mary were definitively approved by the Holy See on 28 February 1873. Jean-Claude Colin died at La Neylière two years later on 15 November 1875.

The Musée Jean-Claude Colin is a private museum in Saint-Bonnet-le-Troncy presenting a retrospective of the life of Fr. Colin.

See also
 John Vianney
 Marcellin Champagnat
 Peter Julian Eymard
 Peter Chanel

References

Further reading
 Kerr, Donal, Jean-Claude Colin, Marist: A Founder in an Era of Revolution and Restoration: The Early Years, 1790-1836,(Blackrock, Co. Dublin: The Columba Press. 2000

External links
Life and spirituality of Jean-Claude Colin

1790 births
1875 deaths
People from Rhône (department)
19th-century French Roman Catholic priests
Founders of Catholic religious communities